BOP (benzotriazol-1-yloxytris(dimethylamino)phosphonium hexafluorophosphate) reagent is a reagent commonly used in the synthesis of peptides.  Its use is discouraged because coupling using BOP liberates HMPA which is carcinogenic, although for small scale use in an organic laboratory this is not a great disadvantage as it is in large scale industrial usage.
BOP has been used for peptide coupling, synthesis of esters, esterification of carboxylic acids, or as a catalyst. This reagent is advantageous in peptide coupling to other derived reagents because there are no side reactions from the dehydration of asparagine or glutamine. In peptide coupling the BOP reagent works well because it forms reactive intermediates which allow for the amines to bond together with little energy loss. In the reduction of carboxylic acids, using the BOP reagent with NaBH4 resulted in high percent yields.

See also
 PyBOP, a related reagent

References

Hexafluorophosphates
Peptide coupling reagents
Benzotriazoles
Biochemistry
Biochemistry methods
Reagents for biochemistry
Quaternary phosphonium compounds